Weeam Amasha (born 8 August 1985) is a Golan Heights-born Druze footballer.

Early life 
Amasha is a Druze from the village Buq'ata, Golan Heights. He holds no official citizenship but rather an Israeli Travel Document. With special permission from FIFA, Amasha played for Israel despite having received interest from the Syrian Football Association. When Amasha goes to a match abroad he is required to get a visa for any country since he doesn't hold a real passport.

Club career 
On 7 June 20, 2011 Amasha signed a four-year contract with Israeli defending champion Maccabi Haifa. Amasha made his debut on 2011–12 UEFA Champions League Second qualifying round, 13 July 2011, against Borac Banja Luka and scored three goals.

International career 
After catching the eye of Israel national team manager, Luis Fernández, Amasha was thought to be on his way to making a full national team appearance. Due to changes in FIFA statutes, Amasha can not represent the full national team without acquiring an Israeli passport. On November 30, 2011, FIFA gave Amasha special permission to play for the Israeli national team without a passport.

Honours

Ironi Kiryat Shmona
Toto Cup (1):
2010–11
Israel State Cup (1):
2014

Maccabi Haifa
Israel State Cup
Runner-up (1): 2012
Israeli Premier League
Runner-up (1): 2012–13

References 

1985 births
Living people
Arab citizens of Israel
Israeli Druze
Arab-Israeli footballers
Druze sportspeople
Hapoel Ironi Kiryat Shmona F.C. players
Maccabi Ahi Nazareth F.C. players
Maccabi Haifa F.C. players
Bnei Sakhnin F.C. players
Hapoel Tel Aviv F.C. players
Hapoel Hadera F.C. players
F.C. Daburiyya players
F.C. Tira players
Liga Leumit players
Israeli Premier League players
Israel under-21 international footballers
Association football forwards
Israeli footballers